The Galaxy Y DUOS GT-S6102 is a mobile phone from Samsung.  It was announced on 22 December 2011 and was released in February 2012. It can hold 2 SIM cards.

See also
 Galaxy Nexus
 List of Android devices
 Samsung Galaxy Y
 Samsung Galaxy Y Pro DUOS

References 

Mobile phones introduced in 2012
Samsung mobile phones
Samsung Galaxy
Samsung smartphones
Android (operating system) devices